The Killing Game may refer to:

 "The Killing Game" (Star Trek: Voyager), a two-part episode from the fourth season of Star Trek: Voyager
 The Killing Game (1967 film), a 1967 French film
 The Killing Game (1988 film), a 1988 American film featuring Barry Foster
 The Killing Game (2011 film), an American action film retitled Arena
 "Killing Game", a song on the album Last Rights by Skinny Puppy